Jesús Alberto Aguilar Padilla (24 February 1952 – 30 January 2023) was a Mexican politician and lawyer from the  Institutional Revolutionary Party (PRI). He was Governor of the state of Sinaloa from 2005 until 2010, and was previously a state congressman, he also served various positions in his party and in the state government.

Aguilar Padilla died on 30 January 2023, at the age of 70.

See also
Governor of Sinaloa
List of Mexican state governors

References

External links
 Résumé: Résumé vitae of Jesus Aguilar Padilla

1952 births
2023 deaths
Politicians from Sinaloa
People from Cosalá Municipality
Institutional Revolutionary Party politicians
Governors of Sinaloa